The Long Trail is a hiking trail in Vermont.

Long Trail can also refer to:
 Long Trail State Forest, a park around the Long Trail in Vermont

Organizations
 Long Trail Brewing Company, a brewery in Bridgewater Corners, Vermont
 Long Trail School, a college-preparatory school in Dorset, Vermont
 Long Trail District, a boy scout district in Vermont

Films
 The Long Trail (film), a 1917 silent film
 The Long Long Trail, a 1929 Western film

See also 
 Long-distance trail